The Colorado Cricket League is a non-profit, eight-clubs with 9 teams cricket organization based in the state of Colorado. The league was formalized in 1985.

History
Cricket has been played in the United States of America since the early 1700s. Cricket has been played in Colorado since the mid-1800.

Colorado cricketers Colin McHattie (Secretary), C. Srinivasan (Treasurer) and Dan Ruparel (President), founded what is now known as the Colorado Cricket League. Ruparel has remained active with the league and the Littleton Cricket Club, McHattie is in Texas and Srinivasan in India. They received endorsements from the five teams that played cricket at that time: The Boulder Cricket Club, The Colorado Cricket Club, The Denver Cricket club, The International Cricket Club of CSU, and The Pakistan Cricket Club. None of these clubs are in existence today, except the CSU Cricket Club (see below) has the most direct roots to its predecessor.

Games were initially played on grassy pitches, which were often uncut with a jute mat laid on top. In 1994 the league switched to concrete-based, carpeted wickets.  Neutral umpires were introduced in 1985.

The catalyst that spurred the creation of the Colorado cricket League in 1985 was for hope and expectation to have our players to try out for the US National Cricket team by participating in tournaments in Kansas and Oklahoma, which were part of the USACA's former Central Zone. Unfortunately due to politics the trials were a farce. A year later, the Colorado cricket League pulled out of the USACA in protest, leading a number other leagues to do the same for the same reason - politics.

Prior to 1985, the "league" was comprised on 5 team from Colorado Springs, Denver, Boulder and Fort Collins. Games were scheduled by the team captains calling each other to schedule games for the following weekend. If the team was busy with a game with another team or with a community social event, then a verbal commitment was made to play the next available weekend.

The captain would then call a representative of another side to get a match scheduled for that weekend. If it worked, a match was played, otherwise the team would end up either playing an intra-squad practice or game and wait for the following weekend.

Upon formalizing the League, schedules were drawn up, standards were created where initially 35 over per inning matches were played. This was changed to 35 in the second year (1986); and in 1992, 40 overs per inning was adopted. One other important modification was adopted - that of neutral umpires. With 5 teams in the league, there was always an idle side. The idle team were responsible to send their more senior players, who it was expected, knew the rules the best, to umpire the matches.

Over the years since then the league has made major strides - hosting invitationals, festivals and tournaments and has played in tournaments in California, Utah, Texas, Kansas and Oklahoma.

Championships

CCL participates in the Central Western region's annual championship. In 2004 CCL won the plate trophy. In 2006 CCL took second place. Afan Sheriff represented Central West and was declared MVP of the western conference tournament.

Organization

In 1985 CCL was officially incorporated as a non-profit organization. The league runs a cricket tournament which takes place from May to September each year and involves approximately 300 players.

CCL has introduced a pilot program called "tennis ball cricket", intended to attract teams from throughout Colorado to increase the league's size to 500 players.

Although, not officially associated with the Colorado Cricket League, Colorado also has an indoor cricket league: The Colorado Indoor Cricket Association and  The Colorado Junior Cricket Association.

Clubs and teams

The CCL is made up of eight clubs and nine teams.

 Boulder Cricket Club
 Coal Creek Cricket Club
 Colorado Springs Cricket Club
 Colorado Crossbats
 Front Range Cricket Club
 Denver Sluggers Cricket Club
 Fort Collins Cricket Club
 Littleton Cricket Club
 Royal Bengal Cricket Club
 University of New Mexico at Albuquerque Cricket Club
 Wyoming Cricket Club

Officers, 2020

 President: [King Sinzu Chase(CMG)]
 Vice President: [Sam Chase (CMG)]
 Secretary: [Haywhay Chase (CMG)]
 Treasurer: Satyanarayana Pushadapu (CCCC)

Tennis Cricket
Mascarenhas Raymond is credited for being the person to introduce the TennisBall Cricket League in CCL in 2005 that many players enjoy till today. In 2008 Rockers team won the league format of this tournament.

In 2010, Orchard won the tournament, while Spartans were runners up.

Website
In 2004 two of the league's members, Michael Doig and Jarrar Jaffari, recognized the need for a central repository for tracking schedules, scorecards, standings, teams and players. Realizing that the web would be most efficient they set about programming and designing the CCL Official Website, driven by the popular PHP language and MYSQL database. The idea was to design a website that would allow a small group of cricket enthusiasts to easily manage a dynamic cricketing portal. This was achieved due to the steadfast dedication of Doig and Jaffari.

Today the CCL boasts detailed news analysis and statistics of each of its games dating well back into the 1990s. It can be proud that it stands strong and well above many cricketing leagues on the planet for its comprehensive coverage and passion.

External links
CCL Official Website
Twitter

References 

Cricket leagues in the United States
Cricket in Colorado
1985 establishments in Colorado
Sports leagues established in 1985